Sigmund Wassermann (* October 16, 1889 in Bamberg; † February 28, 1958 in New York) was a German lawyer and banker.

Childhood and youth until the First World War 
Sigmund Wassermann was the youngest son of Emil Wassermann. He attended the Humanist Gymnasium in Bamberg. He went on to study at the Handelshochschule Berlin and obtained his doctorate from the University of Erlangen on October 22, 1912, with a thesis entitled "Das Sortengeschäft in Deutschland in seiner geschichtlichen Entwicklung" ("The Historical Development of the Variety Business in Germany"). At the end of his studies, he also obtained the academic degrees of Dr. rer. pol. and Dr. jur. He completed his training at Bankhaus L. Behrens & Söhne in Hamburg and at the Paris stockbroking firm Alfred Gans & Co. In 1914/1915, he worked for a short time at Deutsche Bank in Constantinople; his brother Osca later became its chairman.

World War I 
In 1915 Wassermann was drafted as a soldier into the 24th Bavarian Infantry Regiment in Bamberg and was promoted to lieutenant during the war. On September 19, 1917, he was awarded the "Ehrenzeichen P.E.K.. II. class" was awarded to him. His discharge took place on December 18, 1918 from the 5th Bavarian Infantry Regiment as a result of demobilization.

As later honors he received for his participation in the war on August 18, 1927 the possession certificate of the "Prinz-Alfons-Erinnerungszeichen" donated by His Royal Highness, Prince Alfons of Bavaria, as well as on April 23, 1935 the Cross of Honor for Front Combatants based on the decree of July 13, 1934 from the Reich President Field Marshal General von Hindenburg in memory of the World War 1914/18..

Professional career 
On December 30, 1918, he moved from Schützenstr. 21 in Bamberg to Berlin, where he managed the Berlin branch of Bankhaus Wassermann together with his cousin Max von Wassermann. In1919 he became a member of the "Central Committee of German Jews for Aid and Reconstruction", an aid organization for Jewish emigrants from Russia. In 1929 he joined the Initiative Committee for the Expansion of the Jewish Agency. From 1924 to 1934 he lived at Tiergartenstraße 8d with his brother Oscar and his family. He then moved to Rauchstraße 14, thus remaining in a preferred residential area of Berlin. From 1930, as a partner in the Wassermann banking house, he was a member of the "American Chamber of Commerce in Germany". From 1932 to 1933, he was a member of the board of the Centralverband des Deutschen Bank- und Bankiersgewerbes. Together with Max Warburg, Willy Dreyfus and Eugen Mittwoch, he sat on the board of trustees of the Haffkine Foundation, which had taken over the supervisory duties of the "Central Committee." He left this function only after his own emigration.

Escape from Nazi Germany and occupied Netherlands 

After the Nazis came to power in Germany in 1933, Wassermann was persecuted due to his Jewish heritage. On January 21, 1939, Wassermann  escaped to Holland, where he worked for a short time as a banker at N.V. Fidia Financieering en Discontering Maatschappij und Bankierskantoor Albert Graef N.V.. He fled with a passport issued by the Berlin police chief together with a residence permit until September 19, 1941. His place of refuge was Honthorstraat 52 in Amsterdam. 

On January 14, 1941, the occupation authorities of Nazi Germany in the Netherlands granted Wassermann permission to emigrate. He arrived in the USA via Portugal in March 1941, where he lived in New York on 2nd East 86th Street and became a US citizen on May 5, 1947.

In April 1941 he had to sell the painting by Anna Rosina de Gasc An Allegory of Hearing (also known as Woman playing a lute) to the art dealer P. de Boer through his lawyer C. F. van Veen for the price of 1,000 guilders. The painting was restituted to the heirs of Sigmund Wassermann in 2008 following a decision by the Dutch Restitution Commission.

Activities in the USA 
In New York Wassermann belonged to the Fire Department by December 7, 1942, and he received a "Certificate of Literacy" from New York University dated September 28, 1948. In 1946, he worked for the Eutectic Welding Alloys Corp. in Flushing, New York. He had built up the company together with his cousin René from Lausanne. He served as treasurer of the Leo Baeck Institute in New York until his death.

He remained unmarried. Sigmund Wassermann died in New York on February 28, 1958.

Literature 

 Ferdinand von Weyhe: A.E. Wassermann. Eine rechtshistorische Fallstudie zur „Arisierung“ zweier Privatbanken. In: H.-J. Becker (Hrsg.) u. a.: Rechtshistorische Reihe. Bd. 343, Lang, Frankfurt 2007, ISBN 978-3-631-55690-0 (zugl. Diss. Regensburg 2006, S. 48–50).
 Diana-Elisabeth Fitz: Vom Salzfaktor zum Bankier. Familie Wassermann, Spiegelbild eines emanzipatorischen Einbürgerungsprozesses. Steinmeier, Nördlingen 1992, ISBN 3-927496-17-0, S. 103–106.
 National-Archiv (Königreich der Niederlande), NBI 20736 (WE'3907)
 Biographisches Handbuch der deutschsprachigen Emigration nach 1933. K. G. Saur, München / New York / London / Paris 1980, ISBN 3-598-10087-6, S. 797 (mit Werner Röder, Band I: Politik, Wirtschaft, öffentliches Leben) Google Books
 Investigatory report on Wassermann (RC 1.86) - 1 December 2008, S. 2–3.
 Avraham Barkai: Oscar Wassermann und die Deutsche Bank. Bankier in schwieriger Zeit. Beck, München 2005, ISBN 3-406-52958-5.
 Wassermann, Sigmund, in: Joseph Walk (Hrsg.): Kurzbiographien zur Geschichte der Juden 1918–1945. München : Saur, 1988, ISBN 3-598-10477-4, S. 379

Links 

 Recommendation regarding Wassermann. Restitutiecommissie
 Banken jüdischen Ursprungs. Juden in Bamberg
 Guide to the Papers of the Wassermann Family 1842-1942

References 

1889 births
1958 deaths
20th-century businesspeople
Businesspeople from Berlin
Deutsche Bank people
Emigrants from Nazi Germany
German bankers
German Jewish businesspeople
German people of World War II
Jewish art collectors
Jewish emigrants from Nazi Germany
Zionists
Jews who emigrated to escape Nazism